The God of Hell is a play by American playwright Sam Shepard.  The play was written in part as a response to the events of September 11, 2001. The plot concerns Wisconsin dairy farmer Frank and his wife Emma, and how their peaceful middle-American life is destroyed by Mr. Welch, a mysterious, ultra-patriotic government employee in pursuit of Frank's old friend, Haynes.

The God of Hell was first produced at The Actors Studio Drama School Theater in New York City.  It was directed by Lou Jacob, and starred Tim Roth as Welch, Randy Quaid as Frank, J. Smith-Cameron as Emma, and Frank Wood as Haynes.  Previews began October 29, 2004, with the official opening on November 16, 2004.  The show closed on November 28, 2004.

In October 2005, the play received its European premiere at the Donmar Warehouse in London, and featured Lesley Sharp as Emma, Ben Daniels as Welch, Stuart McQuarrie as Frank and Ewen Bremner as Haynes.

The play received its Australian premiere on April 7, 2007. Directed by Robyn Mclean, it was acted by Russel Newman as Frank, Paul Bertram as Haynes, Ripely Hood as Mr. Welch and Annie Cossins as Emma and stage managed by Simon Fox.

See also
List of cultural references to the September 11 attacks

Notes

Plays by Sam Shepard
2004 plays
Plays about the September 11 attacks
Plays set in Wisconsin